Peter Fibiger Bang (born 25 June 1973) is a Danish historian of Rome, empire, cross-cultural comparison and world history. Bang's main research interests are Roman economic history and imperial power, historical sociology and world history, as well as the reception of Classical culture in later ages.

Life 
Born in Horsens, Denmark, in 1973, Bang studied History, Latin and Greek at the University of Aarhus from 1992 to 1999. In 1997, he was a visitor at the University of Leicester, where he studied Roman Archaeology. In 1999, he moved to Corpus Christi College, University of Cambridge, to work on his PhD in the Faculty of Classics. During the autumn of 2001, he was a visitor at the University of Chicago. 

In 2002, Bang was appointed assistant professor in the department of history at the University of Copenhagen before defending his PhD in Cambridge in the summer of 2003. In 2005, he was made associate professor in Copenhagen and during the same year he initiated and was elected chair of a European-based research network, Tributary Empires Compared, to stimulate historical comparison between the Roman, Mughal and Ottoman Empires. This network was funded by COST till 2009.

During his employment in Copenhagen, Bang has been a visiting professor, fellow or academic affiliate at a range of institutions: at the University of Tübingen in summer 2004, at King's College, University of Cambridge in 2007, at the University of Heidelberg in summer 2011, at the Department of Classics, Stanford University in 2014, at the Centre for Advanced Study, Zhejiang University in 2017 and at the RomanIslam Centre, University of Hamburg in 2020. 

Bang has authored, edited or co-edited thirteen volumes as of December 2021, as well as written a substantial number of articles, chapter contributions, reviews and essays. In addition to his academic activities, Bang writes on an occasional basis for the Danish newspaper, Weekendavisen.

Selected works 

 Ancient Economies, Modern Methodologies, Bari: Edipuglia, 2006 (co-editor), 
 The Roman Bazaar. A Comparative Study of Trade and Markets in a Tributary Empire, Cambridge University Press, 2008, 
 Tributary Empires in Global History, Palgrave, 2011,  (co-editor) 
 Universal Empire. A Comparative Approach to Imperial Culture and Representation in Eurasian History, Cambridge University Press, 2012,  (co-editor)
 The Oxford Handbook of the State in the Ancient Near East and Mediterranean, Oxford University Press, 2013,  (co-editor)
 Irregulare Aliquod Corpus? Comparison, World History and the Historical Sociology of the Roman Empire, Copenhagen 2014, 
 The Oxford World History of Empire, 2 Vols. Oxford University Press 2021,  (co-editor)

References

External links
Personal website at SAXO Institute, University of Copenhagen
Tributary Empires Compared – research project on empire and imperialism

1973 births
Living people
People from Horsens
21st-century Danish historians
Danish classical scholars
Aarhus University alumni
Historians of ancient Rome
Alumni of Corpus Christi College, Cambridge